David R. "Fergie" Ferguson (born July 2, 1962, in Nashville, Davidson County, Tennessee) is an American recording engineer.

Career 
Ferguson's career began in the mid-1980s engineering country music recordings for "Cowboy" Jack Clement, at Clement's Cowboy Arms Hotel and Recording Spa, in Nashville, Tennessee. Today, Ferguson is best known for his works with Johnny Cash, as sound engineer on the highly successful Grammy Award-winning American Recordings albums produced by Rick Rubin, in the 1990s and 2000s (decade). Ferguson has also engineered or produced recordings for such artists as folk music legend John Prine, bluegrass music artist Mac Wiseman, Sturgill Simpson, Tyler Childers, The Del McCoury Band, country music legends Charley Pride, Eddy Arnold, rock-n-roll band U2, and many others. Ferguson appeared as himself in the U2 film, Rattle and Hum, and portrayed his mentor and once real-life boss, Jack Clement in the Jerry Lee Lewis film, Great Balls of Fire!. Ferguson maintains a recording studio in Nashville, and resides in nearby Goodlettsville, Tennessee, near his boyhood home.

In 2012, he went on tour with Swedish singer-songwriter Anna Ternheim for whom he recorded her album The Night Visitor.

In April 2020 a collaborative album between John Anderson, Dan Auerbach, and David Ferguson is scheduled for release.

In 2021, Ferguson recorded "The Housebuilding Song" for Rockstar Games' album The Music of Red Dead Redemption 2: The Housebuilding EP, a collection of tracks from the game Red Dead Redemption 2.

References

Further reading
Sound on Sound Magazine interview June, 2010

1962 births
American audio engineers
Living people
People from Nashville, Tennessee
People from Goodlettsville, Tennessee